Everistia is a genus of the flowering plant family Rubiaceae. The sole species Everistia vacciniifolia grows naturally only (endemic) from north eastern New South Wales through to north eastern Queensland, Australia.

Image gallery

References

External links
Everistia in the World Checklist of Rubiaceae

Monotypic Rubiaceae genera
Vanguerieae
Taxa named by Sally T. Reynolds
Taxa named by Rodney John Francis Henderson